Jefferson Central School is a K-12 school located in Jefferson, New York. Built in 1817 by public subscription. They are the home of the Jayhawks and compete in the Delaware Mountain League

References

External links
Official site

Public high schools in New York (state)
Schools in Schoharie County, New York